The  is a unit of the Japan Air Self-Defense Force (JASDF) based at Hamamatsu Air Base in Shizuoka Prefecture, Japan. It oversees the JASDF's Airborne Early Warning squadrons.

Units
 Airborne Early Warning Surveillance Group (Misawa Air Base)
 601st Squadron (JASDF) (Misawa Air Base) (Grumman E-2C)
 603rd Squadron (JASDF) (Naha Air Base) (Grumman E-2C)
 602nd Squadron (JASDF) (Hamamatsu Air Base) (Boeing E-767)

References

Units of the Japan Air Self-Defense Force